The 1986–87 Cypriot Cup was the 45th edition of the Cypriot Cup. A total of 57 clubs entered the competition. It began on 19 November 1986 with the first preliminary round and concluded on 20 June 1987 with the final which was held at Tsirion Stadium. AEL Limassol won their 5th Cypriot Cup trophy after beating Apollon 1–0 in the final.

Format 
In the 1986–87 Cypriot Cup, participated all the teams of the Cypriot First Division, the Cypriot Second Division, the Cypriot Third Division and 12 of the 46 teams of the Cypriot Fourth Division.

The competition consisted of seven knock-out rounds. In the preliminary rounds each tie was played as a single leg and was held at the home ground of the one of the two teams, according to the draw results. Each tie winner was qualifying to the next round. If a match was drawn, extra time was following. If extra time was drawn, there was a replay at the ground of the team who were away for the first game. If the rematch was also drawn, then extra time was following and if the match remained drawn after extra time the winner was decided by penalty shoot-out.

The next four rounds were played in a two-legged format, each team playing a home and an away match against their opponent. The team which scored more goals on aggregate, was qualifying to the next round. If the two teams scored the same number of goals on aggregate, then the team which scored more goals away from home was advancing to the next round.
 
If both teams had scored the same number of home and away goals, then extra time was following after the end of the second leg match. If during the extra thirty minutes both teams had managed to score, but they had scored the same number of goals, then the team who scored the away goals was advancing to the next round (i.e. the team which was playing away). If there weren't scored any goals during extra time, the qualifying team was determined by penalty shoot-out.

The cup winner secured a place in the 1987–88 European Cup Winners' Cup.

First preliminary round 
In the first preliminary draw, participated all the 14 teams of the Cypriot Third Division and 12 teams from the Cypriot Fourth Division (first four of the league table of each group at the day of the draw). Eight out of the 26 teams were drawn to qualify directly to the second preliminary round, without needing to play any match.

Second preliminary round 
The 15 clubs of the Cypriot Second Division advanced directly to the second preliminary round and met the winners of the first preliminary round ties:

First round 
The 16 clubs of the Cypriot First Division advanced directly to the first round and met the winners of the second preliminary round ties:

Second round

Quarter-finals

Semi-finals

Final

Sources

See also 
 Cypriot Cup
 1986–87 Cypriot First Division

Cypriot Cup seasons
1986–87 domestic association football cups
1986–87 in Cypriot football